In heraldry and vexillology, the double-headed eagle (or double-eagle) is a charge associated with the concept of Empire. Most modern uses of the symbol are directly or indirectly associated with its use by the late Byzantine Empire, originally a dynastic emblem of the Palaiologoi. It was adopted during the Late Medieval to Early Modern period in the Holy Roman Empire, Albania and in Orthodox principalities (Serbia and Russia), representing an augmentation of the (single-headed) eagle or Aquila associated with the Roman Empire. In a few places, among them the Holy Roman Empire and Russia, the motif was further augmented to create the less prominent triple-headed eagle.

The motif has predecessors in Bronze Age art, found  in Illyria, Mycenaean Greece, and in the Ancient Near East, especially in Hittite iconography. It re-appeared during the High Middle Ages, from around the 10th or 11th centuries, and was notably used by the Eastern Roman Empire, but 11th or 12th century representations have also been found originating from Islamic Spain, France and the Serbian principality of Raška. From the 13th century onward, it became even more widespread, and was used by the Seljuk Sultanate of Rum and the Mamluk Sultanate within the Islamic world, and within the Christian world by the Holy Roman Empire, Serbia, Albania and Russia.

History

The double-headed eagle first originated in the mighty Sumerian city of Lagash in 3800 BC and was the symbol for the god of Lagash, Ninurta son of Enlil. From cylinders taken from the ruins of this ancient city, the double-headed eagle seems to have been known to the kings of the time as the Storm Bird. The story recorded on these cuneiform cylinders clearly proves that the double-headed eagle of Lagash is the oldest royal crest in the world.

Bronze Age

Polycephalous mythological beasts are very frequent in the Bronze Age and Iron Age pictorial legacy of the Ancient Near East, especially in the Assyrian sphere. These latter were adopted by the Hittites. Use of the double-headed eagle in Hittite imagery has been interpreted as "royal insignia". A monumental Hittite relief of a double-headed eagle grasping two hares is found at the eastern pier of the Sphinx Gate at Alaca Hüyük. For more examples of double-headed eagles in the Hittite context see Jesse David Chariton, "The Function of the Double-Headed Eagle at Yazılıkaya."

In Mycenaean Greece, evidence of the double-eagle motif was discovered in Grave Circle A, an elite Mycenaean cemetery; the motif was part of a series of gold jewelry, possibly a necklace with a repeating design.

Middle Ages
After the Bronze Age collapse, there is a gap of more than two millennia before the re-appearance of the double-headed eagle motif. The earliest occurrence in the context of the Byzantine Empire appears to be on a silk brocade dated to the 10th century, which was, however, likely manufactured in Islamic Spain; similarly early examples, from the 10th or 11th century, are from Bulgaria and from France.

Byzantine Empire

The early Byzantine Empire continued to use the (single-headed) imperial eagle motif.  The double-headed eagle appears only in the medieval period, by about the 10th century in Byzantine art, but as an imperial emblem only much later, during the final century of the Palaiologos dynasty. In Western European sources, it appears as a Byzantine state emblem since at least the 15th century.

A modern theory, forwarded by Zapheiriou (1947), connected the introduction of the motif to Byzantine Emperor Isaac I Komnenos (1057–1059), whose family originated in Paphlagonia.  Zapheiriou supposed that the Hittite motif of the double-headed bird, associated with the Paphlagonian city of Gangra (where it was known as Haga) might have been brought to the Byzantine Empire by the Komnenoi.

Adoption in the Muslim world

The double-headed eagle motif was adopted in the Seljuk Sultanate of Rûm and the Turkic beyliks of medieval Anatolia in the early 13th century. A royal association of the motif is suggested by its appearance on the keystone of an arch of the citadel built at Konya (Ikonion) under Kayqubad I (r. 1220–1237). The motif appears on Turkomen coins of this era, notably on coins minted under Artuqid ruler Nasir al-Din Mahmud of Hasankeyf (r. 1200–1222). It is also found on some stone reliefs on the towers of Diyarbakır Fortress.

Later in the 13th century, the motif was also adopted in Mamluk Egypt; it is notably found on the pierced-globe handwarmer made for Mamluk amir Badr al-Din Baysari (c. 1270), and in a stone relief on the walls of the Cairo Citadel.

Adoption in Christian Europe
Adoption of the double-headed eagle in  Serbia, Russia and in the Holy Roman Empire begins still in the medieval period, possibly as early as the 12th century, but widespread use begins after the fall of Constantinople, in the late 15th century.

The oldest preserved depiction of a double-headed eagle in Serbia is the one found in the donor portrait of Miroslav of Hum in the Church of St. Peter and Paul in Bijelo Polje, dating to 1190. The double-headed eagle in the Serbian royal coat of arms is well attested in the 13th and 14th centuries.

An exceptional medieval depiction of a double-headed eagle in the West, attributed to Otto IV, is found in a copy of the Chronica Majora of Matthew of Paris (Corpus Christi College, Cambridge, Parker MS 16 fol. 18, 13th century).

Early Modern use

Serbia

In Serbia, the Nemanjić dynasty adopted a double-headed eagle by the 14th century (recorded by Angelino Dulcert 1339). The double-headed eagle was used in several coats of arms found in the Illyrian Armorials, compiled in the early modern period. The white double-headed eagle on a red shield was used for the Nemanjić dynasty, and the Despot Stefan Lazarević. A "Nemanjić eagle" was used at the crest of the Hrebeljanović (Lazarević dynasty), while a half-white half-red eagle was used at the crest of the Mrnjavčević. Use of the white eagle was continued by the modern Karađorđević, Obrenović and Petrović-Njegoš ruling houses.

Albania

{{multiple image
 | align = right
 | total_width = 300
 | image1 = Chiesa di Santa Maria la Nova (Napoli) - Chiostro piccolo 037.JPG
 | width1 = 200 | height1 = 300
 | caption1 = The tomb of the Albanian noble Costantino Castriota built in 1500, in Naples. Two Albanian eagles can be noticed in the left and right pillar
 | image2 = Paolo Veronese - The Triumph of Mordecai - WGA24785.png
 | width2 = 250 | height2 = 340
 | caption2 = Trionfo di Mardocheo by Paolo Veronese in the church of San Sebastiano, Venice, 1556. According to a modern analysis of the painting, Skanderbeg who holds the Albanian flag is depicted as the Biblical hero Mordechai who saved the Hebrews in the Babylonian Empire.
 | footer =
}}
The Kastrioti family in Albania had a double-headed eagle as their emblem in the 14th and 15th centuries. Some members of the Dukagjini family and the Arianiti family also used double-headed eagles, and a coalition of Albanian states in the 15th century, later called the League of Lezhë, also used the Kastrioti eagle as its flag. The current flag of Albania features a black two-headed eagle with a crimson background. During John Hunyadi's campaign in Niš in 1443, Skanderbeg and a few hundred Albanians defected from the Turkish ranks and used the double-headed eagle flag. The eagle was used for heraldic purposes in the Middle Ages by a number of Albanian noble families in Albania and became the symbol of the Albanians. The Kastrioti's coat of arms, depicting a black double-headed eagle on a red field, became famous when he led a revolt against the Ottoman Empire resulting in the independence of Albania from 1443 to 1479. This was the flag of the League of Lezhë, which was the first unified Albanian state in the Middle Ages and the oldest Parliament with extant records..

 Russia 

After the fall of Constantinople, the use of two-headed eagle symbols spread to Grand Duchy of Moscow after Ivan III's second marriage (1472) to Zoe Palaiologina (a niece of the last Byzantine emperor Constantine XI Palaiologos, who reigned 1449–1453), The last prince of Tver, Mikhail III of Tver (1453–1505), was stamping his coins with two-headed eagle symbol. The double-headed eagle remained an important motif in the heraldry of the imperial families of Russia (the House of Romanov (1613-1762)).

The double-headed eagle was a main element of the coat of arms of the Russian Empire (1721–1917), modified in various ways from the reign of Ivan III (1462–1505) onwards, with the shape of the eagle getting its definite Russian form during the reign of Peter the Great (1682–1725). It continued in Russian use until abolished (being identified with Tsarist rule) with the Russian Revolution in 1917; it was restored in 1993 after that year's constitutional crisis and remains in use up to the present, although the eagle charge on the present coat of arms is golden rather than the traditional, imperial black.

Holy Roman Empire

Use of a double-headed Imperial Eagle, improved from the single-headed Imperial Eagle used in the high medieval period, became current in the 15th to 16th centuries. The double-headed Reichsadler was in the coats of arms of many German cities and aristocratic families in the early modern period. A distinguishing feature of the Holy Roman eagle was that it was often depicted with haloes.

After the dissolution of the Holy Roman Empire in 1806, the double-headed eagle was retained by the Austrian Empire, and served also as the coat of arms of the German Confederation. The German states of Schwarzburg-Rudolstadt and Schwarzburg-Sondershausen continued to use the double-headed eagle as well until they were abolished shortly after the First World War, and so did the Free City of Lübeck until it was abolished by the Nazi government in 1937. Austria, which switched to a single-headed eagle after the end of the monarchy, briefly used a double-headed eagle – with haloes – once again when it was a one-party state 1934–1938; this, too, was ended by the Nazi government. Since then, Germany and Austria, and their respective states, have not used double-headed eagles.

Mysore (India)

The Gandaberunda'' is a bicephalous bird, not necessarily an eagle but very similar in design to the double-headed eagle used in Western heraldry, used as a symbol by the Wadiyar dynasty of the Kingdom of Mysore from the 16th century. Coins (gold pagoda or gadyana) from the rule of Achyuta Deva Raya (reigned 1529–1542) depicted the Gandaberunda. Of similar age is a sculpture on the roof of the Rameshwara temple in the temple town of Keladi in Shivamogga. The symbol was in continued use by the Maharaja of Mysore into the modern period, and was adopted as the state symbol of the State of Mysore (now Karnataka) after Indian independence.

Modern use

Albania, Serbia, Montenegro and Russia have a double-headed eagle in their coat of arms. In 1912, Ismail Qemali raised a similar version of that flag.  The flag has gone through many alterations, until 1992 when the current flag of Albania was introduced.

The double-headed eagle is now used as an emblem by a number of Orthodox Christian churches, including the Greek Orthodox Church and the Orthodox Autocephalous Church of Albania. In modern Greece, it appears in official use in the Hellenic Army (Coat of Arms of Hellenic Army General Staff) and the Hellenic Army XVI Infantry Division,

The two-headed eagle appears, often as a supporter, on the modern and historical arms and flags of Austria-Hungary, the Kingdom of Yugoslavia, Austria (1934–1938), Albania, Armenia, Montenegro, Russia and Serbia. It was also used as a charge on the Greek coat of arms for a brief period in 1925–1926. It is also used in the municipal arms of a number of cities in Germany, Netherlands and Serbia, the arms and flag of the city and Province of Toledo, Spain, the arms of the town of Velletri, Italy, and the arms and flag of the city of Rijeka, Croatia.

An English heraldic tradition, apparently going back to the 17th century, attributes coats of arms with double-headed eagles to the Anglo-Saxon earls of Mercia, Leofwine and Leofric. The design was introduced in a number of British municipal coats of arms in the 20th century, such as the Municipal Borough of Wimbledon in London, the supporters in the coat of arms of the city and burgh of Perth, and hence in that of the district of Perth and Kinross (1975). The motif is also found in a number of British family coats of arms. In Turkey, General Directorate of Security and the municipality of Diyarbakır have a double-headed eagle in their coat of arms.

Scottish Rite of Freemasonry 
The Double-Headed Eagle is used as an emblem by the Scottish Rite of Freemasonry which was introduced in France, in the early 1760s, as the emblem of the Kadosh degree.  The Ancient and Accepted Scottish Rite of Freemasonry, adopted the 'Double Headed Eagle of Lagash' as its emblem since the 1758 establishment of the Masonic Chivalry Rite (Council of Emperors of the East and West), in Paris, France.  That council, with a Masonic rite of twenty-five degrees, set the foundation for what would evolve into the present masonic system Scottish Rite.  The successors of the "Council of Emperors of the East and West" are today the various Supreme Councils of the Thirty Third Degree in more than 60 countries.  The Double Headed Eagle was formally adopted from the personal emblem of King Frederick the Great, of Prussia, who in 1786 became the First Sovereign Grand Commander of the Supreme Council of the 33 Degree, subsequent to its formation following the adoption of seven additional degrees to the Masonic Rite.

Sports clubs insignia
Several sports clubs, mainly Greek and Turkish, have the double-headed eagle in their insignia. Some of them are: two football clubs of Turkey, BB Erzurumspor and Konyaspor and the Greek sport clubs AEK (Athletic Union of Constantinople) and (since 1929) P.A.O.K. (Panthesalonikios Athletic club of Constantinople). The Greek clubs use this symbol since both were founded by Greek refugees who fled to Greece from Constantinople in the 1920s. It is also the emblem of the Dutch clubs NEC and Vitesse Arnhem, the English football club AFC Wimbledon and Scottish side Saint Johnstone FC. The Gandabherunda insignia is used by the Indian club Bengaluru FC in their logo.

Gallery

Heraldry and vexillology

Artwork

See also
 Arms of Skanderbeg
 Coat of arms of Serbia and Montenegro
 Coat of arms of Austria-Hungary
 Crossed hands
 Hawk of Quraish
 Three-legged crow

References

External links

 
 
 
 
 
 

Heraldic eagles
Imperial Eagle
National symbols of Albania
National symbols of Austria
National symbols of Austria-Hungary
National symbols of Greece
National symbols of Montenegro
National symbols of Russia
National symbols of Serbia
National symbols of Yugoslavia
Religious symbols
Fictional birds of prey
Birds in mythology